McCoys Knob is a mountain located in the Catskill Mountains of New York east-southeast of Hancock. Point Mountain is located north-northwest and Hawk Mountain is located north-northeast of McCoys Know.

References

Mountains of Delaware County, New York
Mountains of New York (state)